Pisuliidae is a small family of insects in the order Trichoptera found in tropical Africa and Madagascar. It was considered a family by Ross (1967). It consists of two genera: Pisulia (with six species) and Silvatares (with ten species). Silvatares was originally classified as Calamoceratidae. The family classification was revised by Stoltze (1987).

References 

Trichoptera families
Integripalpia